The 2013–14 Uruguayan Segunda División is the season of the professional second division of football in Uruguay. A total of 14 teams will compete; the top two teams and the winner of the Championship play-offs are promoted to the Uruguayan Primera División. The club in last position is relegated.

Standings

Promotion Playoffs

See also
2013–14 in Uruguayan football

Uruguayan Segunda División seasons
2013–14 in Uruguayan football
Uruguay
Uruguay